The Scottsdale Unified School District (SUSD) is a school district with its headquarters in Phoenix, Arizona. The  district serves most of Scottsdale, most of Paradise Valley, a portion of Phoenix, and a portion of Tempe.

Its 22 schools earning the state's highest rating, Excelling. All SUSD schools are rated as Performing, Performing Plus, Highly Performing or Excelling by the Arizona Department of Education. In 2011, SUSD was "moving toward making Algebra I available to all eighth-graders".

History
The Scottsdale Unified School District was founded in 1896 by Mayor Winfield Scott, also the founder of the city of Scottsdale. The first classes were taught by Alza Blount, who, for health reasons, moved to Arizona from Illinois with her husband George and their three children. Classes were held in their adobe home, which was just south of what is now Civic Center Plaza and Second Street. Alza Blount was paid $40 a month to teach the 8-10 students from the seven families who resided in Scottsdale at that time.

The district's first bond election was held May 1, 1909, with all 13 citizens voting "yes". The amount of the bond, $5,000, was used to build the district's first school, now known as the "Little Red Schoolhouse." This building, also known at the time as Coronado School, is a historic site on Scottsdale Mall and now the home of the Scottsdale Historical Society.

The district has about 27,000 students and approximately 1,800 certified and 1,000 classified employees; five comprehensive high schools, six middle schools, three K-8 schools, sixteen elementary schools, and one alternative school.

Elementary Schools 
 Anasazi Elementary School
 Cherokee Elementary School
 Cochise Elementary School
 Desert Canyon Elementary School
 Hohokam Elementary School
 Hopi Elementary School
 Navajo Elementary School
 Pima Elementary School
 Pueblo Elementary School
 Redfield Elementary School (formerly Zuni elementary school until approx 2013)
 Sequoya Elementary School
 Tavan Elementary School
 Yavapai Elementary School

K-8 Schools 

 Cheyenne Traditional School
 Copper Ridge School
 Echo Canyon School
 Tonalea K-8 School

Middle Schools  

 Cocopah Middle School
 Desert Canyon Middle School
 Ingleside Middle School
 Mohave Middle School
 Mountainside Middle School

High schools 
The original Scottsdale High School operated from 1922 until 1983.

 Arcadia High School
 Chaparral High School
 Coronado High School
 Desert Mountain High School
 Saguaro High School
 Scottsdale Online Learning

References

External links

 SUSD Home Page
 Arizona Department of Education district report card for 2006-2007

School districts in Maricopa County, Arizona
Education in Scottsdale, Arizona
School districts established in 1896
1896 establishments in Arizona Territory